Sebastian Enderle (born 29 May 1989) is a German football defender.

References

External links
 

1989 births
Sportspeople from Ulm
Footballers from Baden-Württemberg
Living people
German footballers
Association football defenders
VfB Stuttgart II players
FV Illertissen players
3. Liga players
Regionalliga players